Bidgineh (also Romanized as Bīdgīneh and Bīd Gīneh; also known as Bichneh, Bīd Geneh, Bīdkaneh, and Bitkinya) is a village in Golabar Rural District, in the Central District of Ijrud County, Zanjan Province, Iran. At the 2006 census, its population was 880, in 220 families.

References 

Populated places in Ijrud County